Erythrus is a genus of longhorn beetles in the subfamily Cerambycinae.

List of species
 Erythrus angustatus Pic, 1916
 Erythrus apicalis Pic, 1922
 Erythrus apiculatus Pascoe, 1866
 Erythrus ardens Holzschuh, 2011
 Erythrus argutus Holzschuh, 2010
 Erythrus assimilis Aurivillius, 1910
 Erythrus atricollis Pascoe, 1866
 Erythrus atrofuscus Hayashi, 1977
 Erythrus axillaris Aurivillius, 1910
 Erythrus biapicatus Gahan, 1902
 Erythrus bicolor (Westwood, 1848)
 Erythrus biimpressus Pic, 1943
 Erythrus bimaculatus Aurivillius, 1910
 Erythrus blairi Gressitt, 1939
 Erythrus championi White, 1853
 Erythrus coccineus Gahan, 1906
 Erythrus concisus Holzschuh, 2011
 Erythrus congruus Pascoe, 1863
 Erythrus crinitoguttatus Holzschuh, 2006
 Erythrus deceptor Holzschuh, 2010
 Erythrus dentipes Holzschuh, 2009
 Erythrus formosanus Bates, 1866
 Erythrus fortunei White, 1853
 Erythrus fruhstorferi Pic, 1943
 Erythrus fuscescens Holzschuh, 2009
 Erythrus gilvellus Holzschuh, 2006
 Erythrus grandis Vives, 2011
 Erythrus ignitus Pascoe, 1866
 Erythrus intextus Holzschuh, 2011
 Erythrus lacertosus Pascoe, 1866
 Erythrus laosensis Gressitt & Rondon, 1970
 Erythrus laticornis Fairmaire, 1895
 Erythrus ligystropteroides (Lansberge, 1884)
 Erythrus lineatus Pic, 1943
 Erythrus longipennis Pic, 1943
 Erythrus magnus Holzschuh, 2010
 Erythrus montanus Gressitt & Rondon, 1970
 Erythrus multimaculatus Pic, 1916
 Erythrus nayani Holzschuh, 2010
 Erythrus ochreatus Holzschuh, 2010
 Erythrus palliatus (Lansberge, 1884)
 Erythrus putus Holzschuh, 2011
 Erythrus quadrimaculatus Pic, 1916
 Erythrus quadrisignatus Pic, 1943
 Erythrus rhombeus Holzschuh, 2011
 Erythrus rothschildi Ritsema, 1895
 Erythrus rotundicollis Gahan, 1902
 Erythrus rubriceps Pic, 1916
 Erythrus sabahanus Vives, 2010
 Erythrus serratus Holzschuh, 2009
 Erythrus stenideus Holzschuh, 2009
 Erythrus sternalis Gahan, 1902
 Erythrus suturellus Holzschuh, 1984
 Erythrus taiwanicus Heyrovský, 1952
 Erythrus varicolor Holzschuh, 2010
 Erythrus viridipennis Gahan, 1902
 Erythrus westwoodii White, 1853
 Erythrus wuggenigi Holzschuh, 2010

Cerambycinae
Cerambycidae genera